Jim Wayne (born May 21, 1948) was a Democratic Party member of the Kentucky House of Representatives, representing District 35 from 1990 until 2019. He served on the Appropriations and Revenue, State Government, Local Government and Capital Projects and Bond Oversight Committees as well as the Governor's Blue Ribbon Commission on Tax Reform (2012) and the Kentucky Housing Policy Advisory Board. He is a champion of tax reform, affordable housing, campus safety, enhancing penalties for sexual abuse of minors and protection of workers and the vulnerable. Former Representative Jim Wayne was the only mental health professional in the KY State House of Representatives. He chose to retire in 2019. His old state congressional seat is now occupied by Lisa Willner, the only current mental health professional in the KY State House.

External links
Kentucky Legislature - Representative Jim Wayne official KY Senate website
Project Vote Smart - Representative Jim Wayne (MT) profile
Follow the Money - Jim Wayne
2008 2006 2004 2002 2000 1998 1996 1994 campaign contributions

1948 births
Living people
Spalding University alumni
Democratic Party members of the Kentucky House of Representatives
Politicians from Louisville, Kentucky
21st-century American politicians